The CZilla project (also known as the Czech Mozilla Project, CzechZilla) is an official localization team of Mozilla Organization.

The aim of the CZilla project is the localization and popularization of Mozilla.org products in Czech Republic. This includes releasing Czech versions of Mozilla Suite, Firefox, Thunderbird and Nvu, organizing translation of popular extension, translating helps and tutorials, user support, managing collection of Czech sidebars and search plugins, and working on Technical Evangelization in Czech.

The CZilla project was founded in January 2003 as successor of CZilla.org.

See also 
 Mozilla Organization
 Mozilla Europe
 Spread Firefox

External links
 CZilla Main website News, articles and tutorials from the Mozilla world. Prezentation and localization of Mozilla.org products.
 CZilla Forum — Support for Czech users of Mozilla.org products.
 Přejděte na Firefox (Switch2Firefox) — Propagation of Mozilla Firefox.
 Používejte Thunderbird (Use Thunderbird) — Propagation of Mozilla Thunderbird.
 CZilla Start  — Start page for older version of Mozilla Suite and Mozilla Firefox

Mozilla